Congress Township is one of the sixteen townships of Wayne County, Ohio, United States.  The 2000 census found 4,435 people in the township, 2,681 of whom lived in the unincorporated portions of the township.

Geography
Located in the northwestern corner of the county, it borders the following townships:
Harrisville Township, Medina County - north
Canaan Township - east
Wayne Township - southeast corner
Chester Township - south
Perry Township, Ashland County - southwest corner
Jackson Township, Ashland County - west
Homer Township, Medina County - northwest

Three villages are located in Congress Township:
Part of Burbank, in the northeast
Congress, in the south
West Salem, in the northwest

Name and history
Statewide, the only other Congress Township is located in Morrow County.

Government
The township is governed by a three-member board of trustees, who are elected in November of odd-numbered years to a four-year term beginning on the following January 1. Two are elected in the year after the presidential election and one is elected in the year before it. There is also an elected township fiscal officer, who serves a four-year term beginning on April 1 of the year after the election, which is held in November of the year before the presidential election. Vacancies in the fiscal officership or on the board of trustees are filled by the remaining trustees.

Notable people
Henry Totten, Wisconsin State Assemblyman and business, was born in the township.

References

External links
Wayne County township map
County website

Townships in Wayne County, Ohio
Townships in Ohio